Seh Bardan (also Romanized as Seh Bardān; also known as Seh Bardūn) is a village in Tolbozan Rural District, Golgir District, Masjed Soleyman County, Khuzestan Province, Iran. At the 2006 census, its population was 184, in 37 families.

References 

Populated places in Masjed Soleyman County